Jim Hopkins (born 1946) is a New Zealander known for his work in television, radio and theatre.

Biography
Hopkins was scriptwriter for Close to Home, presenter of Fast Forward, Don't Tell Me, The Inventors, Dateline Monday, a performer on The BNZ Festival Debates, and radio talkback host on Radio Pacific in Auckland and Radio Avon in Christchurch.

In August 1998, Hopkins released his first book, Blokes & Sheds, which hit number one on the New Zealand sales list after only a week.  The book profiles amateur inventors from across New Zealand.  Hopkins followed it up with another book, Inventions from the Shed, in 1999, and a 5-part film documentary series with the same name that featured inventors across Australia.

Hopkins was elected as a councillor for the Waitaki District Council, based in Oamaru, in 2007, and became Deputy Mayor in 2010.  In July 2013 he announced his intention to stand for the mayoralty in the local body elections to be held later in the year.

See also
 List of New Zealand television personalities

References

External links
NZ On Screen profile
Speakers New Zealand: Jim Hopkins

Living people
1946 births
New Zealand television journalists
New Zealand television presenters
Place of birth missing (living people)
New Zealand radio presenters
New Zealand journalists